Galit Ronen (born January 2, 1965) is an Israeli diplomat who was Israel's ambassador to Uruguay from 2018 to 2019, and currently serves as ambassador to Argentina.

Biography
Ronen was born on February 1, 1965, in Ramat HaShofet, a kibbutz in northern Israel. She attained a bachelor of science degree in biology from Tel Aviv University in 1990, and a master's degree in microbiology from the same university in 1992. On 1 August 2018 she was confirmed as the State of Israel's ambassador to the Oriental Republic of Uruguay. On 9 September 2019, she presented her credentials before the President of Argentina, confirming her post as the new Israeli ambassador to that nation.

References

1965 births
Kibbutzniks
Tel Aviv University alumni
Living people
Israeli women ambassadors
Ambassadors of Israel to Argentina
Ambassadors of Israel to Uruguay